The coastal miner (Geositta peruviana) is a species of bird in the family Furnariidae.
It is endemic to Peru.

Its natural habitat is subtropical or tropical dry shrubland.

Description 
It is primarily buffy above and white below.

References

External links
Image at ADW

coastal miner
Endemic birds of Peru
Western South American coastal birds
coastal miner
Taxonomy articles created by Polbot
Taxa named by Frédéric de Lafresnaye